Provincial Road 427 (PR 427) is a short provincial road in the Rural Municipality of Headingley, Manitoba, Canada.  

PR 427 is informally known as Wilkes Avenue, its former name before Headingley split from the City of Winnipeg in the 1990s.  PR 427 provides the southern boundary for Beaudry Provincial Park.

Major intersections

References

External links
Official Manitoba Highway Map

427